Brachycoraebus is a genus of beetles in the family Buprestidae, containing the following species:

 Brachycoraebus aruensis Kuban, 1996
 Brachycoraebus basilanensis Bellamy, 2005
 Brachycoraebus baumi (Obenberger, 1929)
 Brachycoraebus borneensis (Kerremans, 1912)
 Brachycoraebus brodskyi Kuban, 1995
 Brachycoraebus buyteti (Baudon, 1961)
 Brachycoraebus cumatilis (Bourgoin, 1922)
 Brachycoraebus disponsae (Baudon, 1968)
 Brachycoraebus helferi Obenberger, 1922
 Brachycoraebus helferiana Cobos, 1957
 Brachycoraebus herychi Obenberger, 1940
 Brachycoraebus horakianus Kuban, 1995
 Brachycoraebus klapperichi Obenberger, 1959
 Brachycoraebus krali Kuban, 1996
 Brachycoraebus longicornis Kuban, 1997
 Brachycoraebus luzonicus Obenberger, 1959
 Brachycoraebus mindanaoensis Bellamy, 2005
 Brachycoraebus minutus Bellamy, 2005
 Brachycoraebus navratili Kuban, 1995
 Brachycoraebus piliferus (Deyrolle, 1864)
 Brachycoraebus punctatus (Baudon, 1968)
 Brachycoraebus rondoni (Baudon, 1968)
 Brachycoraebus svatopluki Kuban, 1995
 Brachycoraebus vicinus (Kerremans, 1900)
 Brachycoraebus viridus (Kerremans, 1900)

References

Buprestidae genera